Sar Margh may refer to:

Sar Margh-e Olya
Sar Margh-e Sofla